Kirchspielslandgemeinden Eider is an Amt ("collective municipality") in the district of Dithmarschen, in Schleswig-Holstein, Germany. Its seat is in Hennstedt. It was formed on 1 January 2008 from the former Ämter Kirchspielslandgemeinde Hennstedt, Kirchspielslandgemeinde Lunden and Kirchspielslandgemeinde Tellingstedt. The Amt is named after the Eider River.

The Amt Kirchspielslandgemeinden Eider consists of the following municipalities (with population in 2005):

References

Ämter in Schleswig-Holstein